The Toy Hearts are an English Bluegrass and Western Swing band from Birmingham.

Its members are Stewart Johnson (Banjo, Dobro, Lap Steel) and his daughters Sophia (vocals, flatpicking guitar) and Hannah (lead vocals, Mandolin, songwriting).

The band cut their first record in 2006. The band is fronted by sisters Hannah and Sophia Johnson, who bring both a feminine, and British perspective, to an essentially American music. However, they keep one foot in the traditional camp by employing their father Stewart on banjo and dobro, while non-family members on double bass and fiddle complete the five-piece line-up.

They released ‘Femme Fatale’ in October 2010, which was recorded in Nashville earlier that year.

Toy Hearts have toured through the UK, the US and Europe and can count new rockabilly Queen ‘Imelda May,’ and veteran broadcaster Bob Harris amongst their fans.

Discography 
 If The Blues Comes Calling, WVR1 (2006)
 When I Cut Loose, WVR2 (2008)
 Femme Fatale, WVR3 (2010)
 Whiskey, WVR4 (2012)

External links
 

English bluegrass music groups
Musical groups from Birmingham, West Midlands
Western swing musical groups